Salt Point is a hamlet and census-designated place (CDP) located in the Town of Pleasant Valley, Dutchess County, New York, United States. As of the 2020 census it had a population of 202. It lies northeast of Poughkeepsie following New York Route 115, the Salt Point Turnpike. East of Salt Point, the Taconic State Parkway allows for access to many of the surrounding towns and communities, with easy travel to New York City. The area code is 845.

Demographics

Parks and recreation
The following parks are located within the general Salt Point area:
 Helen Aldrich Park, part of the Pleasant Valley town recreation system of parks
Frances J. Mark Memorial Park, located in Clinton
Friends' Park, also in Clinton

Communities and locations around Salt Point
Netherwood—A location southwest of Salt Point. 
Pleasant Valley—A hamlet southwest of Salt Point.
Washington Hollow—A hamlet near the southeastern town line. It was the former location of the Dutchess County Fair.
Hibernia—A location east of Salt Point.

References

External links
History of Salt Point, town of Pleasant Valley website

Poughkeepsie, New York
Hamlets in New York (state)
Poughkeepsie–Newburgh–Middletown metropolitan area
Census-designated places in New York (state)